Heritage is a BBC Books original novel written by first time novelist Dale Smith and based on the long-running British science fiction television series Doctor Who. It features the Seventh Doctor and Ace.

Plot

The Seventh Doctor and Ace arrive on Heritage in the year 6048 to visit the Heyworths, who are old friends of the Doctor's. Nobody seems to want them on the planet, and certainly not poking their noses in. But they are stuck there until the next day. The Doctor doesn't want to get involved, but Ace can't help herself: by talking to Lee Marks she finds out that the Heyworths were murdered by the townsfolk, because they threatened to disrupt Professor Wakeling's experiments into cloning. Without the cloning technology, Heritage would have nothing going for it at all.

The Doctor suspects all this, and also that the Heyworth's surviving daughter Sweetness is a clone of her mother created by Professor Wakeling. What he doesn't tell Ace is that Sweetness's mother is his old companion Melanie Bush.

The Doctor confronts Wakeling and ruins his chances of announcing his discoveries to the universe. As Wakeling tries to take revenge on the Doctor, he is caught in a landslide and probably killed.

Continuity

 The story forms part of an ongoing story arc planned by Mike Tucker and Robert Perry, involving the apparent death of Ace. The other books in the arc are Prime Time and Loving the Alien. This in turn feeds into a larger arc involving the apparent deaths of many of the Doctor's companions running through the Past Doctor Adventures and the Eighth Doctor Adventures.
 Following the events of Justin Richards's novel Sometime Never..., it is uncertain whether or not the events of Heritage take place as described, or whether Mel Bush is still alive. Dale Smith has stated that the novel contains a "get-out" clause for allowing Mel to still be alive.
 Although the novel's chapters provide specific dates for all of the action, the later novel Halflife retcons the action to take place several centuries earlier in an attempt to make the lack of stable cloning technology more acceptable. However, the author has pointed out that the novels states that Wakeling was not the first person to develop cloning technology, and that the era was chosen to tie in with the Doctor Who television serial The Invisible Enemy.

Outside References
 The novel was dedicated to "Cathy Howkins", who turns up as a character in the author's later work The Albino's Dancer.
 The avian alien Hadoke who piloted the shuttle that was to take the Doctor and Ace away from Heritage was named after the comedian Toby Hadoke, who attended Manchester University with Dale Smith.

References

External links
The Cloister Library - Heritage

2002 British novels
2002 science fiction novels
Novels by Dale Smith
Past Doctor Adventures
Seventh Doctor novels